Operation Parthenon was a British plan for military intervention in Zanzibar following the 1964 revolution. The operation was authorised by the British Commanders Committee East Africa on 30 January. The main objectives were to restore law and order in Zanzibar and to prevent the radical left-wing Umma Party from taking control of the government from the moderate Afro-Shirazi Party. The forces assigned to the operation included two aircraft carriers, three destroyers, a Royal Fleet Auxiliary vessel, 13 helicopters, 21 transport or reconnaissance aircraft, a battalion of Foot Guards, a battalion of Royal Marines and an independent company of paratroopers. The plan was to launch a helicopter and parachute assault of Unguja, Zanzibar's main island, before proceeding to take the smaller island of Pemba. If it had been carried out, Parthenon would have been the largest British airborne and amphibious operation since the Suez Crisis of 1956.  Parthenon was scrapped around the 20 February and replaced with Operation Boris.

Origins 
The Zanzibar Revolution occurred on 12 January 1964 when 600–800 mainly African men led by John Okello and supported by the Afro-Shirazi and Umma Parties overthrew Sultan Jamshid bin Abdullah and his largely Arab government. This resulted in civil disorder; looting of Arab-owned property; and organised killings of Arabs.  The ASP, led by Abeid Karume, and the Umma Party, under Abdulrahman Mohamed Babu, formed the Revolutionary Council to govern the country. Following these events several western governments, who suspected the revolutionaries had the backing of Cuba, the People's Republic of China and other communist countries, made plans for the evacuation of their citizens. The United States carried out an evacuation of 61 of its citizens, including 16 NASA employees at a satellite tracking station, on 13 January.  Following the American evacuation the US government stated that it recognised that Zanzibar lay within Britain's sphere of influence and that it would not intervene further. The US did, however, urge that Britain co-operate with other African Great Lakes countries to restore order on the island.

The first British military presence in Zanzibar was HMS Owen, a survey ship diverted from the Kenyan coast, which arrived on the evening of 12 January. The frigate HMS Rhyl and Royal Fleet Auxiliary ship RFA Hebe joined Owen at Zanzibar on 15 January. The arrival of HMS Rhyl caused some concern to the revolutionary government as she carried a company of troops from the first battalion of the Staffordshire Regiment who had been sent to Zanzibar from Kenya due to inaccurate reports that security there was deteriorating rapidly.  The Hebe exacerbated the situation as she had just finished removing stores from the naval depot at Mombassa and was loaded with weapons and explosives; as a result the Royal Navy refused to allow representatives from the Zanzibari government on board to search the ship, prompting rumours that she was an amphibious assault vessel.

These forces completed a partial evacuation of British citizens from the island on 17 January.  Shortly after this HMS Rhyl was dispatched to Tanzania with the Staffordshire Regiment company to quell riots in the Tanzanian Army; HMS Owen collected a company of Gordon Highlanders to replace them. On 30 January the British Commanders Committee East Africa authorised Operation Parthenon, whose objective was to restore law and order in Zanzibar should the Revolutionary Council fail to do so.  Specifically there was a concern that the radical left-wing Umma Party, supported by Okello's armed militia, would oust the more moderate members of the ASP from government and seize control.

The operation 

Operation Parthenon would have been a full-scale assault on the revolutionary forces defending Zanzibar to prevent the Umma Party from cementing its control of the island. It would have involved forces far in excess of previous plans which concentrated on the evacuation of and protection of European citizens. The Operation would have involved the landing of British land forces by parachute and helicopter on the island of Unguja to secure the airport before repeating the process on Pemba. The operation plans required a maximum of two aircraft carriers, three destroyers, Owen, 13 helicopters and 21 transport or reconnaissance aircraft. The land forces would have been provided by the second battalion of the Scots Guards, 45 Commando of the Royal Marines and one company of the second battalion of the Parachute Regiment. If it was carried out Parthenon would have been the largest British airborne and amphibious operation since the Suez Crisis. With the revelation, around 20 February, that communist troops may have trained the Zanzibar revolutionaries the British planners decided that a different mix of forces was required for the task and Operation Parthenon was replaced by Operation Boris.

References

Bibliography 
.
.

History of Zanzibar
Parthenon
1964 in military history
1964 in Zanzibar